Pauga Lalau (born 5 October 1975) is a Samoan former boxer. He competed in the men's heavyweight event at the 2000 Summer Olympics.

References

External links
 

1975 births
Living people
Samoan male boxers
Olympic boxers of Samoa
Boxers at the 2000 Summer Olympics
Heavyweight boxers